The Burke River is an ephemeral river in Central West Queensland, Australia. The river was named in memory of Robert O'Hara Burke of the Burke and Wills expedition.

The Burke River rises in the Standish Range north of Boulia. It flows south through Boulia towards the Simpson Desert in the Lake Eyre Basin. The river flows into Eyre Creek, a tributary of the Georgina River. The Hamilton River is the second major Queensland river that flows into the Georgina downstream from the confluence with the Burke.

Yulluna (also known as Yalarnga, Yalarrnga, Jalanga, Jalannga, Wonganja, Gunggalida, Jokula) is an Australian Aboriginal language. The Yulluna language region includes the  local government boundaries of the Shire of Cloncurry and other areas near the Gulf of Carpentaria including the area around the Burke River.

See also

List of rivers of Australia

References

Rivers of Queensland
Lake Eyre basin
Central West Queensland